The Bekkestua Tunnel is a road tunnel that runs under Bekkestua in Bærum, Norway. It forms a part of the Norwegian National Road 160, starts northeast of Bekkestua to ease this population and commercial centre of heavy traffic, and emerges in the southwest near Gjønnes Station. It was opened in 1994, and was financed by the Oslo Package 1.

References

Tunnels in Bærum
Road tunnels in Viken
1994 establishments in Norway
Tunnels completed in 1994